Dave Klein is an American producer, composer and musician with over 25 years' experience as professional drummer, bassist and keyboardist. Recorded and toured throughout North America, Europe, Asia and South America with Agent Orange, Sky Saxon and The Seeds, The Ghastly Ones, Woolly Bandits and The Bomboras and  has worked with Rob Zombie and producers Scott Humphrey, Barry Adamson and Christopher Wade Damerst. Owner and operator of Dave Klein Recording, his private studio located in the hills of Highland Park, California.

Production, recording, and mixed projects
Artists Dave Klein has worked with:
 
The Faction
Decry
The Bomboras
Agent Orange
45 Grave
Mac Sabbath
Guttermouth
Radioactive Chicken Heads
Headnoise
Messer Chups
Tony Valentino of The Standells
Sky Saxon
Powerflex 5
Didi Wray
False Confession
The Clap
PRV13
Destruction Made Simple
Bitch Boys
Enemy Proof
Micheal Fordays
Hear Say
No Refunds
Brook Hoover
Candy Smokes
Sky Lee Vague
Baptized In Sin
Los Mercs
Cleary Country
Lewis Bailey
Charlie Overbey
Kapali Long
Devin Barryhill
Parralell 2 Hell
Par Avion
Mortalis
Creature Preachers
King Archie
Cashew & Cleary
Pandemic Unleashed
Throw The Goat
Gamblers Mark
Soraia
The Love Me Nots
The Ghastly Ones
The Droogs
In The Whale
Chuck Treece
Chris Strompolos
Ami Canaan Mann
Daaman Krall
Rikk Agnew
Kim Shattuck
Casey Royer
Tony Reflux 
The Step Daughters
Lonely Stars
Stay Out
Koi Division
Celebrity Stalker
Frozen Charlottes
Southpaw
LA's Forgotten
Spice Pistols
Justin Paul Sanders
Vince Conrad (Smart Pills, The Aliens)
John Rosewall (The Last, Trotsky Icepick)
Los Grainders (Mexico)
Blaklist
SWINE
The Intros
Sewerside Bombers
Johnny Two Chords
Haze
Empty Tactics
Jabbermouth
The Tiki Creeps
The Ruffolos
The LessOffs
Skarletto and the Apocalypse
The Tankerays
The Slithers
Haymaker (Prague CZ)
Vegas Death Ray
The Blanks
Wick
Shawn Preston
The Whining Pussys
Unpresidented
John Ciulik
The Curse
C:28
45 Spider
The Ultra 4
Shubees
Haiz
Off The Wall
Scurvy Kids
The Hellflowers
The Bots
The Sound Reasons
Good Whales
The Green Machines
The Nathaniel Johnstone Band
The Green Ghosts
The Cherry Drops
The Aquaholics
The Atom Age
The Sirens 
The Unclaimed
Palmyra Delran and Bubble Gun
Moonchasers
The Sloths
The Vooduo
The Thingz
Prost!
Sepo
The Seriouslys
Feral Kizzy
The Tammy Olea Band
Unextraordinary Gentlemen
Galactic Romance
The Last Wolves
BloodPenny
FroBro and Friends
Insect Surfers
Kiss Kiss Bang Bang
The Darklings
The Odd Squad
The 20 Grand Club
The Ghosts of Searchlight
The Beat Killers
Ding Dong Devils
The Rough Boys
The Returners
The Spanks
The Hitz
Thee Spectors
The Headless Hearsemen.
Frozen Charlottes
The Me Gustas

Dave has also recorded with Rob Zombie and Producers Scott Humphrey, Barry Adamson and Christopher Wade Damerst.

Touring
Dave has variously recorded and toured throughout North America, South America, Europe and Asia with:
 Agent Orange
Sky Saxon
The Seeds
Ghastly Ones
The Bomboras
The Witchdoctors
The Finks
The Legendary Invisible Men

Film and game credits

Dave's television, film and game credits include:

 Thrasher Magazine King of the Road series (intro theme)
Speed Traveler (intro theme)
The Adventures of Crash Tucker (theme)
Music featured in The Vampire Diaries (DVD)
FOX Television's "Raising Hope"
2009 release of Night of the Demons
Los Campeones De La Lucha
Starship Troopers
SpongeBob SquarePants
Board Heads
Music featured in Tony Hawk 2 for iPhone
I Was A Teenage Monster Shirt Painter
Additional sound for Bryan Birge's Urban Nomads.

Current projects
He was composing, recording and drumming for OC surf/punk legends Agent Orange, and producing bands in his private studio in Los Angeles.

Discography

Agent Orange 
 Halloween Single - This house Is Haunted b/w Whistling Past The Graveyard, 2010

Woolly Bandits 
 Say Hello To My Little Friend, 2004

Bomboras
 Savage Island, 1995
 Swingin' Singles!, 1996
 Organ Grinder, 1995/1997
 Starship Troopers, 1997
 It Came from Pier 13!, 1997
 Board Headz movie, 1998
 Head Shrinkin' Fun, 1998

The Finks
Fill er up and Go

Ghastly Ones
 A Haunting We Will Go-Go, 1998
 Target: Draculon, 2006
 Unearthed, 2007
 SpongeBob Scaredy Pants, SpongeBob SquarePants: Original Theme Highlights, 2001
 "Flying Saucers Over Van Nuys", green vinyl 45", 2006

The Legendary Invisible Men
Who's Sorry Now?, 2000
Come Get Some, 2002

The Seeds
Red Planet, 2004

The Witchdoctors
Witchdoctor A Go Go

External links
 Dave Klein Production & Recording
 Agent Orange
 The Ghastly Ones

References

3. NYC Mercury Lounge Show Review

Living people
Place of birth missing (living people)
Year of birth missing (living people)
Agent Orange (band) members
American rock drummers
American rock keyboardists